Bear Mountain Indian Mission School is a historic Native American missionary school in Amherst, Virginia.

The school was used by the Monacan tribe since: 
[i]n 1868, [when] a parcel of land was donated for a meeting place for the Indian people. At the time, churches and schools were provided for whites and for blacks, but not for Indians. Originally, a wooden arbor served as the meeting place, and itinerant ministers began to hold Baptist and Methodist services there. Shortly thereafter, a log building was built, to be used for the meeting place. The new church served about 350 Indian people. This building later became the Indian mission school, which still stands at the foot of Bear Mountain.

The school building was built in 1868, and is a single-story, one-room, horizontal log building. A frame addition was built in 1908. The "New School," dating to the 1930s, is a plain frame building sheathed in weatherboard. Associated with the school is St. Paul's Episcopal Church, a rectangular wood-frame building with Gothic style detailing.  It was built in 1930, after the original mission church was destroyed by fire.  A mission worker's house is also extant, a small "L"-plan wood frame dwelling.

The buildings were added to the National Register of Historic Places in 1997.

References

External links
Carey Johnson, "Monacan Indians working to restore school," The Free Lance-Star - Jun 25, 2002 https://news.google.com/newspapers?nid=1298&dat=20020625&id=SfEyAAAAIBAJ&sjid=pwgGAAAAIBAJ&pg=6831,7287645

Baptist churches in Virginia
Methodist churches in Virginia
Properties of religious function on the National Register of Historic Places in Virginia
Buildings and structures in Amherst County, Virginia
School buildings completed in 1868
School buildings on the National Register of Historic Places in Virginia
National Register of Historic Places in Amherst County, Virginia
Monacan